Ehlers may refer to:

 Ehlers–Danlos syndrome
 Ehlers (surname)